Romelle Burgess (born March 14, 1982) is a Barbadian international footballer who plays for Paradise SC.

Career

College
Born in Saint Michael, Burgess moved to the United States in 2002 to attend Southern New Hampshire University, becoming just one of four college soccer players there to earn All-Conference honors four times.

Professional
Burgess turned professional in April 2006 when he signed for the New Hampshire Phantoms, then of the USL Second Division. After scoring two goals in 34 appearances, Burgess returned to his native Barbados, spending two seasons with the Eden Stars, before returning to the Phantoms for the 2010 season.

International
Burgess is a full international for the Barbadian national team, having made his debut in 2000. Burgess was a team member for the 2002 and 2010 FIFA World Cup qualifying campaigns.

Burgess has also represented Barbados at youth level, and is a former captain of the Barbadian national Under-23 team.

International goals
Scores and results list Barbados' goal tally first.

References

1982 births
Living people
Barbadian footballers
Seacoast United Phantoms players
Association football midfielders
Barbados international footballers
USL Second Division players
USL League Two players
Southern New Hampshire Penmen men's soccer players
Eden Stars FC players
Paradise FC (Barbados) players
People from Saint Michael, Barbados